Robin Kovář (born April 2, 1984) is a Czech professional ice hockey player who is currently playing for the Milton Keynes Lightning in the National Ice Hockey League.

Career statistics

References

External links

1984 births
Living people
Blackburn Hawks players
Czech expatriate ice hockey players in Canada
Czech ice hockey forwards
Edmonton Oilers draft picks
Czech expatriate ice hockey people
HC Havířov players
HC Kometa Brno players
HC Slovan Ústečtí Lvi players
HKM Zvolen players
Hokej Šumperk 2003 players
Kemphanen Eindhoven players
Manchester Phoenix players
MHk 32 Liptovský Mikuláš players
People from Valašské Meziříčí
PSG Berani Zlín players
Regina Pats players
SK Horácká Slavia Třebíč players
Swindon Wildcats players
Vancouver Giants players
VHK Vsetín players
Yertis Pavlodar players
Milton Keynes Lightning players
Sportspeople from the Zlín Region
Expatriate ice hockey players in the Netherlands
Czech expatriate sportspeople in England
Czech expatriate sportspeople in Hungary
Czech expatriate sportspeople in Kazakhstan
Expatriate ice hockey players in England
Expatriate ice hockey players in Kazakhstan
Expatriate ice hockey players in Hungary
Czech expatriate ice hockey players in Slovakia